Mohammed Badaru Abubakar (MON) (born in Babura 19 September 1962)  Muhammadu Badaru went to Mal. Nuhu Hassan Special Primary School Babura, in 1970 and proceeded to the famous Rumfa College, Kano from where he went for his A levels at the School of Basic Studies at the Ahmadu Bello University, Zaria in 1981. and got admitted into the university to graduate with a Bachelor of science degree in Accountancy in 1985. In 2006, Alhaji Muhammadu Badaru Abubakar also went to the prestigious National Institute for Policy & Strategic Studies, (NIPSS), Kuru Jos. Badaru is the 4th democratically elected Governor of Jigawa State in Nigeria. He is the Chairman, Presidential Committee on Fertilizer and also the Chairman, Presidential Committee on Non oil Revenue. And he is the owner of Talamiz group of industries.

Education
Abubakar is a graduate of Ahmadu Bello University, Zaria where he obtained a B.Sc Accounting degree. While studying at the university, he became involved in community activism, sport and business. Badaru is also an alumnus of the National Institute of Policy and Strategic Studies (NIPSS) in Kuru.

Career as industrialist
After his graduation he established his business, the Talamiz Group, a conglomerate with diverse interest in automobiles, manufacturing, agriculture and animal husbandry, as well as commodity distribution.

Career in politics
Abubakar was Vice President II of the Federation of the West Africa Chamber of Commerce and industiries  and a Fellow of the Association of National Accountants of Nigeria. Prior to that, he was a member of the National Council on Privatisation.

Badaru is currently the National President of the Nigerian Association of Chambers of Commerce, Industry, Mines and Agriculture. He also was a gubernatorial candidate of Action Congress of Nigeria but lost to Sule Lamido. Abubakar also contested for governorship under the platform of the All Progressives Congress in 2015 along with PDP contender Mal. Aminu Ibrahim Ringim. The Independent National Electoral Commission on 13 April 2015, declared him the winner of that election.

On 9 March 2019 Jigawa State gubernatorial election Badaru was re-elected as governor having polled a total of 810,933 votes, the candidate of the Peoples Democratic Party, PDP, Aminu Ibrahim Ringim scored 288,356 while the candidate of the Social Democratic Party, SDP, Bashir Adamu Jumbo scored 32,894 votes, thereby making him the winner of the election.

Awards
In recognition of his hard work, philanthropic activities, Abubakar was conferred with the traditional title of Sardaunan Ringim in Ringim emirate and Walin Jahun in Dutse emirate councils respectively. He was also conferred with the national honour of the Member Of The Order Of Niger (MON) by the President of the Federal Republic of Nigeria in 2006.

See also
List of Governors of Jigawa State

References

External links 

• Badaru appointed special assistant for his wife street light in Jigawa Daily Trust Nigeria

Governors of Jigawa State
Nigerian business executives
1962 births
Living people
Nigerian company founders
All Progressives Congress politicians
Rumfa College alumni